Penny Arcade is an American webcomic focused on video games and video game culture. 

Penny Arcade or penny arcade may also refer to:

Music 
"Penny Arcade", a 1967 single by The Cyrkle
"Penny Arcade", a 1969 song by Roy Orbison
Penny Arcade (album), a 1973 jazz album by Joe Farrell
"Penny Arcade" (Cristy Lane song), 1978

Other uses 
Penny arcade, or amusement arcade, venue containing games 
 Penny Arcade, a 1929 play led by American actor and dancer James Cagney
Penny Arcade, an early video game by Bill Budge, mimicking Pong
Penny Arcade (performer) (born 1950), stage name of performance artist and playwright Susanna Ventura